The Campbells is  a period drama television drama series produced by Scottish Television, an affiliate of British television network ITV, and Canadian television network CTV which ran from 1986 to 1990. The series starred Malcolm Stoddard as James Campbell, a Scottish doctor living in 1830s Upper Canada with his three children, seventeen-year-old Neil (John Wildman), fourteen-year old Emma (Amber-Lea Weston) and eleven-year-old John (Eric Richards). Cedric Smith played their neighbor, Captain Sims.

In Canada, it aired on CTV on Thursdays at 7:30 p.m. and in the United States on CBN on Saturdays at 7:00 p.m. The series also aired in the United Kingdom on ITV starting on 27 April 1986.

Premise
The series begins in 1832 in Scotland, during the Highland Clearances, when many families were evicted from their homes. This led to a surge in immigration to Canada. Dr. James Campbell, a widower with three children, treated the broken leg of the son of a wealthy landowner but, after a servant woman applied unsterile home remedies to the leg, the boy died of infection. Dr. Campbell was blamed for the death, and he lost his livelihood.

The Campbells heard of Canada's need for settlers and decide to start a new life in a new land. Dr. Campbell sets up a medical practice, and the entire family take up farming.

The series has been described as the "Canadian Little House on the Prairie" but producer John Delmage stated that, while The Campbells might be similar to Little House, "we don’t have as much sugar."

Production
The series was greenlit in 1985 with production stating in June of that year.  Most of the episodes were shot on location at a 50-acre farm owned by the Ontario Heritage Foundation, and all clothing, furnishings, and the doctor's medical treatments, were historically accurate.

The premiere episode was partly filmed in Scotland, as were two episodes broadcast in 1989, when Dr. Campbell and his daughter, Emma, briefly return to their native country.

Cast
Malcolm Stoddard as Dr. James Campbell.
John Wildman as Neil Campbell, the eldest son.
Amber-Lea Weston as Emma Campbell, the daughter. 
Eric Richards as John Campbell, the youngest son.
Cedric Smith as Captain Thomas Sims, the wealthy neighbor.
Brigit Wilson as Harriet Sims, Captain Sims' wife.
Wendy Lyon as Rebecca Sims, Captain Sims’ daughter.
Barbara Kyle as Charlotte Logan, the innkeeper.

Episodes

Season 1

Season 2

Season 3

Season 4

Media availability
In 1996 GoodTimes Entertainment released a two volume VHS set of selected episodes entitled Adventures On the Prairie With The Campbells. On June 23, 2015, Timeless Media Group released The Campbells - The Complete Series on DVD in Region 1.

References

External links 

 BFI
 

Scottish television shows
CTV Television Network original programming
1986 Canadian television series debuts
1990 Canadian television series endings
1980s Canadian drama television series
1990s Canadian drama television series
Television shows set in Ontario
Television shows set in Scotland
Period family drama television series
Television shows produced by Scottish Television
English-language television shows